Idora Park was a  Victorian era trolley park in north Oakland, California constructed in 1904 on the site of an informal park setting called Ayala Park on the north banks of Temescal Creek. It was leased by the Ingersoll Pleasure and Amusement Park Company that ran several Eastern pleasure parks. What began as a pleasure ground in a rural setting for Sunday picnics evolved into a complete amusement park visited by many residents of the San Francisco Bay Area. Its popularity declined after the advent of the automobile, and it was closed and demolished in 1929.

History

Opening 
The Realty Syndicate constructed the park in 1903 on the north banks of Temescal Creek in North Oakland (on a site of present-day Ayala Park). The main gate of the park was located on Telegraph Avenue above 56th Street; and the park was located on the block bounded by Telegraph Avenue, Shattuck Avenue, 56th and 58th streets. When the park opened in 1903, Rodney Ingersoll had erected the first figure-eight "sky railway" on the site. A wall surrounded the park. Admission was 10 cents, and it was open 30 or more weeks per year.

Operations 
Idora Park was leased by the Ingersoll Pleasure and Amusement Park Company that ran several Eastern pleasure parks. Originally its name was to be Kennywood Park (after an amusement park in Pennsylvania). Mr. Ingersoll may have decided to name it after his daughter, Idora. The Realty Syndicate also owned and operated the Key System transit company, the Claremont Hotel and the Key Route Inn. The company's major partners were Frank C. Havens; and Francis M. "Borax" Smith, who earned his fortune in borax mining, subsequently investing it in transit and commercial and housing properties in the East Bay area. Bertrand York managed the park from 1911 until its razing in 1929.

Idora Park Opera Company 
Idora Park was famous for its opera house. In the aftermath of the 1906 San Francisco earthquake, as many as 2,500 displaced people found shelter in Idora Park. Food and relief supplies were provided by the Realty Syndicate, purchased from Capwell's Department Store. In the period that followed the 1906 earthquake, comic stars from the Tivoli Theater of San Francisco relocated to Oakland and renamed themselves the Idora Park Opera Company. Shows like The Mikado, The Pirates of Penzance and The Wizard of the Nile were performed under the theater direction of Ferris Hartman, with music direction by Paul Stiendorff in a wooden opera house called the Wigwam Theater. 

In 1908, the company changed names to the Dollar Grand Opera Company and later to the San Carlos Opera Company, which toured nationally.

Rides

Idora Park rides cost 5 cents. Many were advertised as being the "largest" or "first." Rides were renamed regularly. In published descriptions of the park, one finds titles such as Dodge 'em, The Whip, Over the Top, Race Through the Clouds, and the Magic Carpet.

Roller coasters
The park has five traditional roller coasters during its history:

Attractions

In the early 1900s, Idora Park was also the site of public demonstrations with lighter-than-air and heavier-than-air flying machines, including a balloon-launched glider flight by David Wilkie in a glider designed by John J. Montgomery on February 22, 1906. It was also the location for the final construction of The California Arrow, a dirigible built by Thomas Baldwin in 1904. On August 3, 1904, the first successful round-trip difficult flight in the United States was made by Baldwin with The California Arrow at Idora Park.

Idora Park boasted the first outdoor public address system and the largest horn loudspeaker built by Magnavox; the first radio theater in the West; and a huge searchlight. Like many things at the park, the searchlight was reputed to be the largest in the world; as well as their largest Victrola tower; and the largest roller skating rink west of Chicago. It has been said that Charlie Chaplin and Buster Keaton improved their skating skills at the Idora Park roller rink. The evening light display used so much power that it outstripped the original capacity, and a new system had to be installed in 1907.

The walled-in park had a zoo, ostrich farm, performing animal shows, dance hall, racetrack, outdoor amphitheater, Japanese garden, bear grotto, a main street called the Glad Way, and a penny arcade, photo gallery, and shooting gallery. 

In 1904 a ballpark with a 3000-seat double deck grandstand was erected, and after the 1906 earthquake, the Pacific Coast League relocated there. The park had the largest roller skating rink in California, the largest west of Chicago, that rented clamp-on skates. A bandstand was at its center. The Mountain Slide had a firework volcanic display on Saturday nights. There were hot-air balloon ascensions, from which the acrobatic team of Frank and Carrie Hamilton parachuted.

At The Laying Hens, participants threw a ball at a wooden hen sitting on a barnyard fence, and if it were hit, it fell over and delivered a hard-boiled egg to eat. The park offered electric souvenirs, table tennis, a musical arcade, a dancing pavilion, a roof garden and grill, lunch counters, open-air concerts, and numerous refreshment booths.

Entertainment
Vaudeville performers sorted in Idora Park's stages. Famous stars who emerged from Oakland included Hobart Bosworth, Fatty Arbuckle, Mabel Normand, and possibly Lon Chaney. Walter DeLeon made his playwright debut at Idora Park. Aimee Semple McPherson held the largest outdoor baptism to date before 10,000 spectators in the swimming tanks after returning from the Far East following the death of her husband Robert James Semple.

Something called the Cabaret de la Mort existed for a time. Jack London's daughter Becky described trips to Idora Park with her father.

Refreshments
Idora Park was famous for its cream waffles (a recipe later published in the Oakland Tribune in 1972). Ice cream, popcorn and Coney Island "Red Hots" were a nickel, whiskey cost a dime, Busch Beer from St. Louis cost a nickel. The park's restaurant featured full-course meals for 75 cents to one dollar, and soda pop was available in 12-ounce bottles.

Demise
Idora Park was eclipsed by the rise of the automobile and Neptune Beach in nearby Alameda. It closed in January 1929, and was razed later that year. A plan to develop the Central Square, an apartment and business complex by architect Hamilton Murdock, was announced. The Depression interrupted these plans, and a variety of small storybook houses and worker housing apartment blocks were eventually constructed on the 17-acre site. 

By the 1930s, the Idora Park neighborhood subdivision was primary an Italian immigrant enclave, which thrived for many years. In 1930, a new roller rink, Rollerland, was constructed facing Telegraph Avenue in the 5400 block.

References

 Clippings file, Oakland History Room, Oakland Public Library, 125 14th Street Oakland CA 94612
 Oakland Enquirer - April 12, 1902, May 6, 1902, November 26, 1903
 Oakland Herald - April 20, 1907
 Berkeley Daily Gazette - February 4, 1943
 Montclarion - July 26, 1978, January 24, 1997
Oakland Herald April 20, 1907
 Oakland Tribune - July 19, 1908, January 27, 1929,  April 26, 1931, June 30. 1929, October 7, 1943, July 23, 1944, & May 10, 1970

External links 

 picture postcards of Idora Park
 roller coaster database
 Oakland History room
 Oakland Heritage Association. Photos of Idora Park
 1915 Keystone Movie: Mabel's Wilful Way
 1911 Sanborn Fire Insurance Map of park grounds

Defunct amusement parks in California
History of Oakland, California
1904 establishments in California
1929 disestablishments in California
Baseball venues in California
Sports venues in Oakland, California
Demolished buildings and structures in California
Buildings and structures demolished in 1929